Stamnostoma is an extinct genus of seed ferns based on cupules with seeds. These are among the earliest known seed plants and of earliest Carboniferous (Tournaisian) age.

Description 
The ovules of Stamnostoma have a complex apex with plug and cone mechanism for creating a chamber for prepollen, as in other Lyginopteridales. Several ovules are borne on an elongate open cupule of bracts.

Whole plant reconstructions 
Different organs attributed to the same original plant can be reconstructed from co-occurrence at the same localities in the Scottish Borders county of Berwickshire. 
Stamnostoma huttonense may have been produced by the same plant as Telangium (prepollen organ), Colatisporites decorus (prepollen), Lyginorachis papilio (permineralized petioles), Aneimites acadica (leaves), and Pitus primaeva (permineralized wood).

References 

Pteridospermatophyta
Mississippian plants
Prehistoric plant genera
Mississippian first appearances
Mississippian extinctions